Gabriel Hanot (6 November 1889 – 10 August 1968) was a French footballer and journalist (the editor of L'Équipe). The European Cup – which became the UEFA Champions League – was the brainchild of Hanot, as was the Ballon d'Or, an award that honours the male player deemed to have performed the best over the previous year.

Biography
He made 12 appearances for the France national football team, with his debut coming on 8 March 1908 against Switzerland. He was also part of France's squad for the football tournament at the 1908 Summer Olympics, but he did not play in any matches. He made another 10 appearances for them up to World War I. After the war he played one more time for France, as captain against Belgium on 9 March 1919.

Following an aviation accident he gave up football and became a journalist. He is credited with introducing the professional championship in France, in 1932.

Hanot and his colleague at L'Équipe Jacques Ferran were the prime movers behind getting the European Cup established.

References

External links
 

1889 births
1968 deaths
French footballers
Sportspeople from Arras
Footballers from Hauts-de-France
France international footballers
BFC Preussen players
US Tourcoing FC players
France national football team managers
Founders of association football institutions
French sports journalists
French male non-fiction writers
Association football fullbacks
French football managers
20th-century French male writers
French military personnel of World War I